Serious Hits… Live! is the name of Phil Collins' 1990 live album, released on vinyl, cassette and CD. It is also the title of the 2003 DVD video release of his concert at Berlin's Waldbühne on 15 July 1990. (The original 1990 VHS and Betamax version of the video was titled Seriously Live.) The songs on the CD version are taken from various concerts during the Seriously, Live! World Tour. At the Brit Awards in 1992, the album brought Collins a nomination for British Male Artist.

History
When compiling the tracks for the album, instead of providing the experience of a complete live concert, the producers took the approach of putting together a "hits only" selection of songs. On the final song of the album, Collins thanks the fans in Chicago.

The live video and DVD version features one entire concert. The live performance at Berlin's Waldbühne has been hailed by Collins as his best performance due to the energy of the German people after the fall of the Berlin Wall.  The DVD presents an in-depth look at his solo concert experience. Special moments include the crowd not allowing the concert to continue with prolonged applause after "Something Happened on the Way to Heaven" and the lighter vigil during "Doesn't Anybody Stay Together Anymore".

Track listing
All tracks written by Phil Collins, except where noted.

Original 1990 LP

DVD track listing
"Hand in Hand"
"Hang in Long Enough"
"Against All Odds (Take a Look at Me Now)"
"Don't Lose My Number"
"Inside Out"
"Do You Remember?"
"Who Said I Would"
"Another Day in Paradise"
"Separate Lives"
"Saturday Night and Sunday Morning"
"The West Side"
"That's Just the Way It Is"
"Something Happened on the Way to Heaven"
"Doesn't Anybody Stay Together Anymore"
"One More Night"
"Colours"
"In the Air Tonight"
"You Can't Hurry Love"
"Two Hearts"
"Sussudio"
"A Groovy Kind of Love"
"Easy Lover"
"Always"
"Take Me Home"

The version of "Doesn't Anybody Stay Together Anymore" performed on the Serious Hits… Live! recording differs considerably from the original version on the album No Jacket Required, having been re-arranged into a ballad style.

Personnel

The Serious Guys 
 Phil Collins – vocals, electric grand piano, drums
 Brad Cole – keyboards
 Daryl Stuermer – guitars
 Leland Sklar – bass
 Chester Thompson – drums

The Seriousettes 
 Bridgette Bryant – vocals
 Arnold McCuller – vocals
 Fred White – vocals

The Phenix Horns 
 Don Myrick – alto saxophone 
 Louis "Lui Lui" Satterfield – trombone
 Rahmlee Michael Davis – trumpet
 Harry Kim – trumpet

Production 
 Directed by Jim Yukich
 Produced by Paul Flattery and Tony Smith
 Audio Produced by Phil Collins and Robert Colby
 Engineered by Paul Gomersall
 Mixed by Paul Gomersall and Robert Colby
 Remixed at The Farm, Townhouse Studios and Great Linford Manor (England, UK); The Power Station (New York, NY); A&M Studios (Los Angeles, CA).
 Design – Phil Collins and Wherefore Art?
 Photography – Lewis Lee

Charts

Weekly charts

Year-end charts

Certifications

Album

Video

Reception
allmusic  [ link]

See also
Philip Collins Ltd v Davis [2000] 3 All ER 808
List of best-selling albums in Argentina
List of best-selling albums in Brazil
List of best-selling albums in France
List of best-selling albums in Germany

References

1990 live albums
1990 video albums
Phil Collins live albums
Live video albums
Albums produced by Phil Collins
Phil Collins video albums
Virgin Records live albums
Virgin Records video albums
Atlantic Records video albums
Atlantic Records live albums
Warner Music Group live albums
Warner Music Group video albums